Academy Building may refer to:

 Academy Building (University of Southern Maine), Gorham, Maine, listed on the National Register of Historic Places (NRHP)
 Academy Building (Fall River, Massachusetts), listed on the NRHP
 House of Providence (Vancouver, Washington), commonly known as the Academy Building; NRHP-listed